Gaia Bassani Antivari (born July 8, 1978) is an Italian-born alpine skier who competed for Azerbaijan at the 2010 Winter Olympics, and 2014.

She previously competed for Grenada, and attempted to compete for them at the 2002 Winter Olympics. However, she couldn't as the GOA did not submit paperwork. She withdrew from the Slalom of 2014 Olympic Winter Games due to a serious injury suffered just three days before the race.

References

External links
 
Olympic Reference Profile

1978 births
Living people
Alpine skiers from Milan
Italian female alpine skiers
Azerbaijani female alpine skiers
Grenadian female alpine skiers
Naturalized citizens of Azerbaijan
Italian emigrants to Azerbaijan
Italian emigrants to Grenada
Olympic alpine skiers of Azerbaijan
Alpine skiers at the 2010 Winter Olympics
Alpine skiers at the 2014 Winter Olympics